Thomas Fahr Steyer (born June 27, 1957) is an American climate investor, businessman, hedge fund manager, philanthropist, environmentalist, and liberal activist. Steyer is the co-founder and co-chair of Galvanize Climate Solutions, founder and former co-senior-managing-partner of Farallon Capital and the co-founder of OneCalifornia Bank, which became (through merger) Beneficial State Bank, an Oakland-based community development bank. Farallon Capital manages $20 billion in capital for institutions and high-net-worth individuals. The firm's institutional investors include college endowments and foundations. Steyer served on the board of trustees at Stanford University from 2007 to 2017. Since 1986, he has been a partner and member of the executive committee at Hellman & Friedman, a San Francisco–based private equity firm.

In 2010, Steyer and his wife signed The Giving Pledge to donate half of their fortune to charity during their lifetime. In 2012, he sold his stake in and retired from Farallon Capital. Switching his focus to politics and the environment, he launched NextGen America, a nonprofit organization that supports progressive positions on climate change, immigration, health care, and education.

Steyer sought the Democratic nomination for president in 2020, but dropped out of the race after the first four state contests, having spent more than $191 million on campaign advertising but failing to obtain any pledged delegates.

In 2021, Steyer co-founded Galvanize Climate Solutions with Katie Hall, his longtime friend and business partner. Galvanize is a climate-focused, global investment firm.

Early life and education
Steyer was born in Manhattan. His mother, Marnie (née Fahr) was a teacher of remedial reading at the Brooklyn House of Detention and his father, Roy Henry Steyer was a partner in the New York law firm of Sullivan & Cromwell, and was a prosecutor at the Nuremberg Trials. His father was a non-practicing Jew, and his mother was Episcopalian.

Steyer grew up on the Upper East Side of Manhattan, and attended the Buckley School and Phillips Exeter Academy. He graduated from Yale University summa cum laude in economics and political science, and was elected to Phi Beta Kappa. He was captain of the soccer team. At Yale, Steyer was a member of Wolf's Head Society  Steyer received his MBA from Stanford Graduate School of Business, where he was an Arjay Miller Scholar. He has served on the Stanford University board of trustees.

Career
After graduation from Yale, Steyer began his professional career at Morgan Stanley in 1979. After two years at Morgan Stanley, he attended Stanford Graduate School of Business. Steyer worked at Goldman Sachs from 1983 to 1985 as an associate in the risk arbitrage division, where he was involved in mergers and acquisitions. He later became a partner and member of the Executive Committee at Hellman & Friedman, a San Francisco–based private equity firm.

In January 1986, Steyer founded Farallon Capital, a hedge fund firm headquartered in San Francisco. Steyer made his fortune running Farallon, which was managing $20 billion by the time he left the company. Steyer was known for taking high risks on distressed assets within volatile markets.

In October 2012, Steyer stepped down from his position at Farallon in order to focus on advocating for alternative energy. Steyer decided to dispose of his carbon-polluting investments in 2012, although critics say he did not dispose of them quickly enough and noted that the lifespan of the facilities he funded would extend through 2030. A 2014 New York Times article said coal-mining companies that Farallon invested in or lent money to under Steyer had increased their coal production by 70 million tons annually since receiving money from Farallon, and that Steyer remained invested in the Maules Creek coal mine. Prior to Steyer leaving Farallon, a student activist group called UnFarallon criticized the company for investments in companies with anti-environmental policies. In 2016, some critics noted that Farallon had also invested in private prisons while Steyer was leading the hedge fund. According to SEC filings, Steyer was at the helm as the hedge fund purchased nearly $90 million of Corrections Corporation of America stock (5.5% of the company's outstanding shares). After leaving Farallon, Steyer hosted a two-day think-tank entitled the 'Big Think Climate Meeting' to discuss how to address climate change.

On April 17, 2020, it was announced that California Governor Gavin Newsom had selected Steyer to chair a task force focused on the state's economic recovery after the 2019–20 coronavirus pandemic. The task force will also include former Federal Reserve Chair Janet Yellen, Disney Executive Chairman Bob Iger, and Apple Inc. CEO Tim Cook. Steyer's co-chair was political advisor Ann O'Leary.

Philanthropy
In 2006, Steyer and his wife, Kat Taylor, founded OneRoof, Inc., a B Corp and social enterprise business designed to bring broadband connectivity, computer literacy, and employment skills via OneRoof Internet Centers to small rural towns in rural India and Mexico.

In 2007, Steyer and Taylor founded Beneficial State Bank, a community development bank, for the purpose of providing commercial banking services to underserved Bay Area businesses, nonprofits, and individuals, with operations now in California, Oregon, and Washington. Its stock ownership is entirely held by a foundation such that all profits are reinvested in local communities.

Steyer and Taylor put up $22.5 million to start the bank and create the One PacificCoast Foundation to engage in charitable and educational activities, provide lending support, investments, and other services for disadvantaged communities and community service organizations in California.

In August 2010, Steyer and his wife signed onto The Giving Pledge, an initiative of Bill Gates and Warren Buffett.

Steyer and Taylor created the TomKat Ranch in Pescadero, California, near Half Moon Bay. The ranch is meant to research and demonstrate a sustainable way of doing agriculture. The ranch's activities include underwriting healthy food programs and co-producing an independent film, La Mission, starring Benjamin Bratt, about San Francisco's Mission neighborhood. Around 2011, Steyer joined the board of Next Generation, a nonprofit intending to tackle children's issues and the environment. In 2013, Steyer founded NextGen Climate, an environmental advocacy nonprofit and political action committee.

In August 2015, Steyer launched the Fair Shake Commission on Income Inequality and Middle Class Opportunity, which was intended to advocate policies for promoting income equality.

Political activity
In 1983, Steyer worked on Walter Mondale's presidential campaign. He raised money for Bill Bradley in 2000 and John Kerry in 2004.

An early supporter of Hillary Clinton in 2008, Steyer became one of Barack Obama's most prolific fundraisers. Steyer served as a delegate to the Democratic National Conventions in 2004 and 2008. Steyer has been a member of the Hamilton Project and has been involved with the Democracy Alliance, a network of progressive donors whose membership in the group requires them to donate at least $200,000 a year to recommended organizations.

After the Obama victory in 2008, Steyer was considered for appointment as Secretary of Treasury. Jim Steyer, Tom's brother, told Men's Journal that Obama and his advisors would regret having chosen someone else, due to his expertise. In January 2013, rumors briefly arose that Steyer might be named as a replacement for Energy Secretary Steven Chu. Asked whether he would accept such an appointment, Steyer said he would.

Ballot measures
In 2010, Steyer joined former the Secretary of State, San Francisco-based George Shultz, to co-chair the No on Prop. 23 campaign, the measure on the November 2010 ballot concerning California's environmental legislation, AB32. He donated $5 million to the campaign, which defeated Proposition 23.

In 2012, Steyer was the leading sponsor of Proposition 39 on the ballot in California. Its purpose was to close a loophole that allowed multi-state corporations to pay taxes out of state, mandating that they pay in California. Steyer contributed $29.6 million, saying that he could wait no longer for the change.

While supporters of Steyer's effort said it would "help break the partisan gridlock in Sacramento", critics objected that "the increasing involvement of rich individuals perverts the original intent of the initiatives". Kim Alexander, president of the California Voter Foundation, said that the level of giving was unprecedented for an individual donor. Some critics called the initiative an ineffective jobs stimulus, while Steyer labeled it a success for closing a corporate loophole.

2012
In 2012, Steyer hosted a fundraiser at his home for President Obama. At a private meeting, Steyer, along with fifteen other top donors, reportedly pressed the president regarding the Keystone pipeline, which Steyer opposed. Obama was said to be supportive of Steyer's views, but reluctant to put his full weight behind any initiatives without better proof. Steyer was critical of Obama's decision to keep an energy initiative as a low priority.

Democratic National Convention speech
Steyer gave a speech at the 2012 Democratic National Convention, saying that the election was "a choice about whether to go backward or forward. And that choice is especially stark when it comes to energy". Steyer said that Republican presidential nominee Mitt Romney would take no action to reduce U.S. dependence on fossil fuels; rather, he said, Romney would increase it. Steyer went on to support Obama's policies, which he described as investments to "make us energy independent and create thousands of jobs."

2013–2014

Anti-Keystone rally
In February 2013, Steyer spoke at an anti-Keystone XL Pipeline rally on the Washington Mall organized by Bill McKibben and attended by tens of thousands. McKibben asked Steyer to join the protest by tying himself to the White House gate and getting arrested, but Steyer was dissuaded by his brother Jim.

NextGen America
In 2013, Steyer founded NextGen Climate (now NextGen America), an environmental advocacy nonprofit and political action committee. NextGen Climate provided the environmentalist movement with significant capital and political influence. Steyer spent almost $74 million on the 2014 elections.

In October 2017, NextGen America donated grants totaling $2.3-million to eight national immigration law service organizations, including the University of California Immigrant Legal Services Center, the Immigration Law Clinic at U C Davis School of Law, U C Hastings Center for Gender and Refugee Studies, Asian Americans Advancing Justice — Asian Law Caucus, California Rural Legal Assistance Foundation, Center for Community Change, American Immigration Lawyers Association, and the Council on American-Islamic Relations.

Electoral campaign activity
In 2014, Steyer funded political campaigns to advocate for the election of at least nine candidates and to influence climate change policy through NextGen Climate. Those races included helping elect Ed Markey of Massachusetts over Stephen Lynch to the Senate in a special election in 2013. Reportedly, Steyer spent $1.8 million attacking Lynch, including money for a plane Steyer paid to fly over a Boston Red Sox game with a banner that read, "Steve Lynch for Oil Evil Empire".

Steyer supported Democrat Terry McAuliffe's successful 2013 campaign for governor of Virginia through his NextGen Climate Action, contributing funds for paid media (such as television advertisements) and get-out-the-vote efforts. Steyer also supported Democrats in Senate races in Iowa, Colorado, New Hampshire, and Michigan and in Gubernatorial races in Pennsylvania, Maine, and Florida. Steyer cited Florida's pivotal role in the 2016 presidential election and its geographic position, which makes it highly vulnerable to climate change, as reasons for his focus on the state.

In June 2014, Steyer said he planned to get involved in California legislative races, targeting three to four races in each house of the Legislature in a bid to affect climate change policy. The Guardian reported in 2014 that Steyer had become the single largest donor in American politics and is the leading advocate of environmental issues.

Steyer spent about $67 million of his personal fortune in the 2014 midterm elections and had a 40% success rate. Of the seven Senate and gubernatorial candidates NextGen Climate supported, three won their races.

2015
In April 2015, Steyer testified before the California Legislature in favor of a greenhouse-gas reduction bill. In August 2015, Steyer was the guest of honor at the California Democratic Party headquarters to discuss bills to cut gasoline use in half by 2030, although Steyer did not commit to spending large sums of money to support the bills.

In July 2015, Steyer called on 2016 candidates to develop strategic plans to provide the United States with at least 50% of its energy from clean sources by 2030. Reportedly, the message was targeted at Hillary Clinton, who had yet to outline an environmental policy. It was suggested that this was a strategic move to secure a political alliance with Clinton.

2016

Steyer raised money for Hillary Clinton, and he hosted a fundraiser on her behalf at his Burlingame home. Steyer contributed $87,057,853 in funds exclusively to Democratic Party candidates during the 2016 election cycle.

Trump impeachment campaign
Beginning in October 2017, Steyer spent approximately $10 million for a television ad campaign advocating the impeachment of Donald Trump, and more on a digital ad campaign to call for Trump's impeachment. In the ad, Steyer identifies himself only as an "American citizen" and alleges that Trump "brought us to the brink of nuclear war, obstructed justice at the FBI, and in direct violation of the Constitution has taken money from foreign governments and threatened to shut down news organizations that report the truth." Trump responded by calling Steyer "wacky and totally unhinged."

The Need to Impeach campaign led to speculation that Steyer was planning a run for California governor or California senator in 2018, although he did not do so. In March 2018, Steyer launched a 30-city town hall tour and, going into the fall election season, the campaign had amassed close to 6 million petition signatures.

Steyer stepped down from his role as President at Need to Impeach in July 2019 when he announced his presidential campaign. As of 2019, he has reportedly spent over $70 million in the effort. Steyer said Need to Impeach will continue under new leadership and named Nathaly Arriola, as the new Executive Director.

Potential gubernatorial bid
Steyer considered running for governor of California in 2018 but in January 2018 announced that he would not run in the election.

2020 presidential campaign

After initially indicating that he would not seek the presidency, Steyer launched a campaign for the Democratic presidential nomination on July 9, 2019, in an online campaign video posted to Twitter. As a self-funded candidate, Steyer committed himself to spending millions of dollars in campaign advertising.

Steyer qualified for, and participated in, six televised Democratic primary debates and failed to qualify for one debate.

Steyer came in seventh place in the Iowa caucuses and sixth place in the New Hampshire primaries out of the 11 active candidates, receiving no delegates. He earned no national pledged delegates from Iowa, New Hampshire, or Nevada. Steyer spent a great deal of time and money in South Carolina, far outspending other candidates. However, on February 29, 2020, he finished third (behind Joe Biden and Bernie Sanders). Following that result, he suspended his campaign.

Steyer spent over $253 million, with all but a little over $3.5 million coming from his personal funds. This amount worked out to be $3,373 for every vote he received in the three primaries where he was on the ballot before dropping out of the race. During Steyer's time as a candidate, his campaign spending surpassed that of every other Democratic candidate except for fellow billionaire Michael Bloomberg.

Political positions

Environmentalism

Keystone Pipeline
After holding several conversations during the summer of 2012 with environmental writer Bill McKibben, Steyer decided to focus much of his attention on the Keystone Pipeline. Steyer officially left Farallon in 2012. He was criticized by some Republicans for attacking the pipeline even though he held some investments in the fossil-fuel industry. The investments included stock in Kinder Morgan, which had its own pipeline connecting the Canadian bitumen sands to a port on the Pacific, which could be seen as a rival to the Keystone pipeline. Steyer promised to fully unload his holdings there within a year. In September 2013, Steyer appeared in a series of commercials in opposition to the proposed pipeline.

In a November 2015 interview, Steyer described the Obama administration's decision to reject the Keystone pipeline as "fantastic."

Global warming and renewable energy

In 2008, Steyer and Taylor gave $41 million to create the TomKat Center for Sustainable Energy at Stanford University. Part of the Precourt Institute of Energy, it is focused on the development of affordable renewable energy technologies, and promotion of public policies to make renewable energy more accessible. Projects included the creation of lighter, less toxic, and more durable batteries, and an analysis of the then-current power grids capacities to support future renewable energy technologies.

In October 2013, Steyer launched a bipartisan initiative to combat climate change along with then-New York City mayor Michael Bloomberg and former Treasury Secretary Henry Paulson. The initiative, called the Risky Business Project, focuses on quantifying and publicizing the economic risks of climate change in the United States. Bloomberg, Paulson, and Steyer serve as co-chairs. The Project has published three reports—a National Report in June 2014, a Midwest Report in January 2015, and a California Report in April 2015.

In 2015, Steyer signed on to the Bill Gates Breakthrough Energy Coalition. The goal of the coalition is to jumpstart the demand and availability of green energy sources.

Healthcare

Steyer opposes Medicare for All but supports expanding coverage.

Gun control
Regarding gun control, Steyer supports a ban on assault weapons and universal background checks.

Campaign finance
Asked in a November 2014 interview why he invests his money into elections rather than philanthropic organizations, Steyer stated that the price of inaction is too high not to take a direct role. He has said that he opposes Citizens United v. FEC, the 2010 Supreme Court decision allowing unlimited corporate donations to super PACs, but since climate change is urgent he will take necessary actions to provide funding nonetheless.

Taxation
In an interview in October 2017, Steyer said that he was in favor of raising personal taxes. He said that upper-income people in the United States had done "disproportionately well" at the expense of working families. Steyer called one version of a 2017 Republican tax reform proposal a "thinly veiled reverse Robin Hood". Steyer supports a wealth tax for anyone worth at least $32 million.

5 Rights 
In November 2018, in a full-page USA Today ad, Steyer outlined five non-partisan issue areas on which he said the Democrats should campaign, and which "represent essential freedoms that should be guaranteed for all Americans": voting rights protections, a clean environment, a complete education, a living wage, and good health.

Awards and honors

Steyer has received a number of awards and honors for his environmental work, including the Phillip Burton Public Service Award of Consumer Watchdog (2011), the Environmental Leadership Award of the California League of Conservation Voters (2012), the Environmental Achievement Award of the Environmental Law Institute (2013), and the Land Conservation Award of the Open Space Institute (2015).

Steyer received Equality California's 2015 Humanitarian Award "for his work advancing progressive causes that benefit the LGBT community."

Personal life
In August 1986, Steyer married Kathryn Ann Taylor, a graduate of Harvard College who earned a Master of Business Administration and a Juris Doctor from Stanford University. The Reverend Richard Thayer, a Presbyterian minister, and Rabbi Charles Familant performed the ceremony. They have four children, Samuel Taylor ("Sam"), Charles Augustus ("Gus"), Evelyn Hoover ("Evi"), and Henry Hume ("Henry"). Kathryn was on the President's Council for the United Religions Initiative, an interfaith group.

Steyer has two brothers: Hume Steyer, an attorney in New York City and Jim Steyer, an attorney, author, and a Stanford University professor.

Steyer has a net worth of $1.6 billion. Men's Journal mentioned the modest aspects of his lifestyle noting that he owns an "outdated hybrid Honda Accord" and eschews luxury items such as expensive watches.  Steyer wears tartan neckties every day, because in his words “You gotta dress up for a fight.”

In his late 30s, Steyer had "a revelation" and began an involvement in the Episcopal Church, the religion of his mother (his father was a non-practicing Jew). He has stated that during this time he became much more interested in religion and theology. The new interest reportedly galvanized his political advocacy.

In 2018, Steyer received two suspicious packages from convicted mail bomber Cesar Sayoc.

References

External links

 Official website
 Farallon Capital Management
 Hellman & Friedman LLC
 

1957 births
20th-century American businesspeople
21st-century American businesspeople
21st-century philanthropists
Activists from California
American Episcopalians
American billionaires
American environmentalists
American hedge fund managers
American people of Jewish descent
American political fundraisers
Association football defenders
Buckley School (New York City) alumni
Businesspeople from New York City
Businesspeople from San Francisco
California Democrats
Candidates in the 2020 United States presidential election
Giving Pledgers
Goldman Sachs people
Living people
Morgan Stanley employees
New York (state) Democrats
People from the Upper East Side
Philanthropists from New York (state)
Phillips Exeter Academy alumni
Stanford Graduate School of Business alumni
Stanford University trustees
Yale Bulldogs men's soccer players
Yale College alumni
Yale University alumni
People from Pescadero, California
Association football players not categorized by nationality